North Miami Beach (commonly referred to as NMB) is a city in Miami-Dade County, Florida, United States. Originally named "Fulford-by-the-Sea" in 1926 after Captain William H. Fulford of the U.S. Coast Guard, the city was renamed "North Miami Beach" in 1931. The population was 43,676 at the 2020 census.

History
In the 1920s, Carl G. Fisher built an all-wooden racetrack with stands for 12,000 spectators, known as the Fulford–Miami Speedway. This event, held on February 22, 1926, dubbed the Carl G. Fisher Cup Race, was a forerunner to the auto races at Sebring and Daytona. In September 1926, after just one race, the track was destroyed by the 1926 Miami Hurricane.

The hurricane of 1926 essentially ended the South Florida real estate boom, and in an effort to alleviate their losses and the damage to the city, local residents came together as the Town of Fulford. In 1927, it was incorporated as the City of Fulford.

Geography
It is bordered to the southeast by the city of North Miami, to the southwest by unincorporated Golden Glades, to the west by the city of Miami Gardens, to the north by unincorporated Ojus, to the northeast by the city of Aventura, and to the east across the Intracoastal Waterway by the city of Sunny Isles Beach.

U.S. Route 1 (Biscayne Boulevard) runs through the east side of the city, leading south  to downtown Miami and north  to Fort Lauderdale. Interstate 95 runs along the northwest border of the city, with access from Exit 12.

Although the North Miami Beach boundaries once stretched to the Atlantic Ocean, the city no longer has any beaches within its limits. They are now a short distance away, within the city of Sunny Isles Beach across the Intracoastal Waterway.

Climate

Surrounding areas
  Miami Gardens, Ives Estates, Ojus, Aventura
  Miami Gardens    Sunny Isles Beach
 Miami Gardens, Unincorporated Miami-Dade County, Golden Glades   Ojus, Aventura, Sunny Isles Beach
  Golden Glades    North Miami
  Golden Glades, North Miami

Demographics

2020 census

As of the 2020 U.S. census, there were 43,676 people, 13,676 households, and 9,308 families residing in the city.

2010 census
As of 2010, there were 16,402 households, out of which 12.1% were vacant. As of 2000, 37.6% had children under the age of 18 living with them. 44.3% were married couples living together, 19.5% had a female householder with no husband present, and 29.9% were non-families. 23.9% of all households were made up of individuals, and 8.6% had someone living alone who was 65 years of age or older. The average household size was 2.89 and the average family size was 3.44.

2000 census
In 2000, the city population was spread out, with 27.3% under the age of 18, 9.4% from 18 to 24, 30.9% from 25 to 44, 21.1% from 45 to 64, and 11.3% who were 65 years of age or older. The median age was 34 years. For every 100 females, there were 91.6 males. For every 100 females age 18 and over, there were 86.3 males.

In 2000, the median income for a household in the city was $31,377, and the median income for a family was $35,047. Males had a median income of $26,278 versus $22,110 for females. The per capita income for the city was $14,699. About 18.4% of families and 20.5% of the population were below the poverty line, including 25.1% of those under age 18 and 18.2% of those age 65 or over.

As of 2000, English was the first language for 38.50% of all residents, while Spanish accounted for 31.97%. French Creole was 19.32%, French made up 2.33%, Chinese (which included Cantonese) was totaled at 1.66%, Portuguese totaled 1.20%, Hebrew was at 0.87%, Russian at 0.65%, Yiddish spoken by 0.56%, and Italian was the mother tongue for 0.52% of the population.

North Miami Beach has a large middle class Haitian-American, Arab-American, and Jewish-American community who were born in the U.S. or abroad.

Despite Asians making up only 3.4% of North Miami Beach's population, the city's main commercial artery along NE 167th street converging into North Miami Beach Boulevard and then becoming 163rd street, has taken the unofficial name of "Chinatown" due to the large concentration of Asian owned and operated businesses in the area. The area has been referred to unofficially as "Chinatown" since the early 1990s by both locals and North Miami Beach city officials. As of late, even Miami-Dade County officials have begun to reference the area as Chinatown. Local guides and Miami websites have called 163rd street Miami's unofficial Chinatown.

2019 United States Census Bureau American Community Survey estimates

Attractions

Attractions in the vicinity of North Miami Beach include a line of popular Atlantic Ocean beaches, Ancient Spanish Monastery, Oleta River State Park, Greynolds Park, East Greynolds Park, Fulford-by-the-Sea Monument, and Aventura Mall.

North Miami Beach's has a historic 12th century medieval Spanish monastery, the St. Bernard de Clairvaux Church. This stone building around a patio, the cloisters of the Monastery of St. Bernard de Clairvaux, was built in Sacramenia, Segovia, Spain in the 12th century. It was purchased by William Randolph Hearst in the 1920s, dismantled and shipped to the United States, and reassembled after Hearst's death in North Miami Beach in the 1950s. It is a tourism attraction and a popular spot for weddings.

Parks and recreation
In 1966, a major accomplishment was the completion of the tennis complex and two community centers, Victory Park and Uleta Community Center.

In 1968, the Washington Park Community Center was built, and the Allen Park Youth Center was completed in 1973.

North Miami Beach expanded its parks in the 1980s as a result of the city commission making strides to benefit the community.

The city now has the Judge Arthur I. Snyder Tennis Center. It includes twelve lighted clay Hydrogrid tennis courts, six lighted lay-kold hard tennis courts, four racquetball courts, and two paddleball courts. The center also has a clubhouse and pro-shop, a picnic area, and lounge and shower facilities.

Government and infrastructure
North Miami Beach is governed by a commission-manager system in the form of a Mayor, Commission, and a professional City Manager. In this type of a government, commission members are the leaders and policy makers in the community. This form of government was implemented in 1958, after a new charter was voted on.

The mayor is elected citywide and serves up to two consecutive two-year terms.

There is an elected mayor and six-member city commission, with the city manager, city clerk, and city attorney being appointed positions that are responsible for implementing the policies of the city commission.

The Federal Bureau of Investigation (FBI) Miami field office was previously in North Miami Beach. It moved to Miramar on December 8, 2014.

In 1993, in an effort to promote neighborhood stability throughout the city, North Miami Beach built a state-of-the-art police station and redeveloped infrastructure in the Government Center neighborhood.

The bond program Proud Neighborhoods took place in September 2000 and had 67 different projects. This allowed for the improvement of streets, sidewalks, lighting and landscaping in every neighborhood of the city. It took five years but it brought substantial improvements.

In the wake of the nearby Surfside condominium building collapse on June 24, the city stepped up building inspections and enforcement, and on July 2, condemned a 10-story condominium, Crestview Towers.

Education

Primary and secondary schools
Miami-Dade County Public Schools serves North Miami Beach.

Public elementary schools
Fulford Elementary School
Greynolds Park Elementary School
Madie Ives Elementary School
Oak Grove Elementary School
Ojus Elementary School
Sabal Palm Elementary

Public middle schools
Highland Oaks Middle School
John F. Kennedy Middle School

Public high schools
Alonzo and Tracy Mourning Senior High Biscayne Bay Campus
Dr. Michael Krop Senior High School
North Miami Beach Senior High School

Prior to the opening of North Miami Beach High and Krop, students from North Miami Beach were assigned to Miami Beach High School and Miami Norland High School.

Private schools
 Yeshiva Toras Chaim
 Beth Jacob High School
 Allison Academy
 Toras Emes Academy Klurman Elementary School
 Young Leaders Academy K–8
 Fulford Christian Academy

Colleges and universities
Nova Southeastern University – Miami Campus
 Union Institute and University – North Miami Beach campus

Public libraries
North Miami Beach Public Library (NMB Library), also referred to as the Lafe Allen Public Library, is a 23,000 square foot facility located at 1601 NE 164th Street in North Miami Beach, Florida. The library's collection currently contains over 60,000 items, including both fiction and non-fiction materials, DVDs, audio books, compact discs, newspapers, magazines, and foreign language materials. Digital services include access to e-materials and reference resources, such as Florida Electronic Library, Newsbank, Reference USA, World Book, NoveList Plus, and more.

In 1959, the North Miami Beach Library was initially opened inside of a storefront on NE 163rd Street as a branch of the Miami-Dade Public Library System (then known as the City of Miami Library system). This location was relocated and expanded to two storefronts at the corner of NE 19th Avenue and NE 169th Street the following year. In 1961, however, the city ended its attachment with the City of Miami Library system and became an independent library. After residents of the City of North Miami Beach voted to build a permanent location for the library in 1964, a new building was constructed on 164th Street and opened in 1965. Renovations to this facility in 1981 and 1994 grew the branch from its original 10,000 square feet to make room for the library's expanding collection.

The NMB Library offers a variety of services to the residents of North Miami Beach, such as access to study and meeting rooms, employment resources, early literacy programs, voter registration forms, citizenship materials, and passport assistance. Computers, printers, copiers, scanners, and fax machine services are also available. The library's dedicated teen area, known as the Discovery District, is a space specifically designed to provide library patrons aged 13–19 with a place to read, study, or work on school projects. Access to computers, 3D printers, virtual reality, and zSpace for educational and recreational purposes is also provided.

Notable people
 Garcelle Beauvais, actress and television personality
 Andrea Bocelli, Italian tenor
 Johnathan Cyprien (born 1990), NFL safety
 Louis Delmas, former NFL safety
 Paul Gleason, film and television actor
 Max Jean-Gilles, former American football guard
 MC Jin, rapper, actor, and comedian
 Larry Kahn (born 1953/1954), tiddlywinks player
 Marlins Man, sports fan and lawyer
 Brad Meltzer, writer
 Cheryl Patton (born 1949), Miss Florida USA 1967, Miss USA 1967
 Sheryl Sandberg, business executive and philanthropist
 Jonathan Zaslow, sports radio show host

References

External links

 
 Spanish Monastery site

 
Populated places established in 1927
Cities in Miami-Dade County, Florida
Populated places on the Intracoastal Waterway in Florida
Cities in Florida
Cities in Miami metropolitan area
1927 establishments in Florida